Secăreni is a commune in Hînceşti District, Moldova. It is composed of three villages: Cornești, Secăreni and Secărenii Noi.

References

Communes of Hîncești District